Khalmion is a village in Kadamjay District, Batken Region in south-west Kyrgyzstan, sitting practically on the border with Uzbekistan's Fergana Region. Its population was 6,274 in 2021. The village lies just to the west of the tiny enclave  belonging to Uzbekistan, less than 1 km2 in area. This enclave is located north-northwest of another Uzbek enclave (Shakhimardan).  The Kyrgyz villages of Khalmion and Jangy-Ayyl lie outside opposite edges of this enclave, within 1 km of the Kyrgyz-Uzbek main border.

Population

References

Populated places in Batken Region